Ballinacor North is a barony in County Wicklow, Republic of Ireland.

Etymology
Ballinacor North derives its name from the Ballinacor Castle. (from Irish Baile na Corra, town of the weir).

Location

Ballinacor North is located in central County Wicklow, in the Wicklow Mountains.

History
Ballinacor North: the O'Byrne (Ó Broin) sept, originally of Kildare, were centred near here after the 12th century and included the territory of Gabhal Raghnaill.
 The original Ballinacor barony was divided into north and south in 1798.

List of settlements

Below is a list of settlements in Ballinacor North:
Rathdrum

References

Baronies of County Wicklow